The Colorado Commission on Higher Education (CCHE) was established in 1965 by the Colorado General Assembly. The Commission replaced an association which met informally to consider matters related to higher education. The Colorado Department of Higher Education (DHE) is the principal department of the Colorado state government responsible for implementing the policies of the CCHE.

In 1985 the Assembly gave the Commission increased authority and specific directives through the passage of House Bill 1187.
Specific responsibilities include developing long-range plans for an evolving state system of higher education:
Review and approve degree programs.
Establish the distribution formula for higher education funding; recommend statewide funding levels to the legislature.
Approve institutional capital construction requests; recommend capital construction priorities to the legislature.
Develop policies for institutional and facility master plans.
Administer statewide student financial assistance programs through policy development, program evaluation, and allocation of funds.
Develop and administer a statewide off-campus (extended studies), community service, and continuing education program.
Determine institutional roles and missions.
Establish statewide enrollment policies and admission standards.
Conduct special studies as appropriate or directed, regarding statewide education policy, finance, or effective coordination.
Four-Year Schools that are managed/supervised by the Commission through their Trustees/Board of Governors/Board of Regents

The eleven-member board appointed by the governor of Colorado to create and enforce policy for Colorado public higher education.

Adams State College
Colorado School of Mines
Fort Lewis College
Mesa State College
Metropolitan State University of Denver
University of Northern Colorado
Western State College
Colorado State University
Colorado State University - Pueblo
University of Colorado at Boulder
University of Colorado at Colorado Springs
University of Colorado Denver

See also
Colorado Community College System

References

External links
Colorado Commission on Higher Education 

1965 establishments in Colorado
Public education in Colorado